Saikat Nasir is a Bangladeshi Cinematographer, writer, and director. He won the Bangladesh National Film Award for Best Cinematography for the film Desha: The Leader (2014).

Films
 Desha: The Leader - (2014)
 Hero 420 - (2016)
 Pashan - (2018)
 Talaash - (2022)
 Casino - (Upcoming) 
 Akbar: Once Upon A Time In Dhaka - (Upcoming) 
 Masud Rana - (Upcoming) 
 A Journey With You - (Upcoming) 
 The Border - (Upcoming) 
 Cash - (Upcoming) 
 Agnee 3 - (Upcoming)
 London Love (Upcoming)

Web series
 Trapped
 Bad Boys
 Network

Awards and nominations
National Film Awards

Babisas Award

Channel i Music Awards

References

External links
 

Bangladeshi cinematographers
Best Cinematographer National Film Award (Bangladesh) winners
Year of birth missing (living people)
Living people